Irene Osgood (1875 – 12 December 1922) was an American novelist, poet and dramatist.

Biography
She was born near Richmond, Virginia, in 1875 and spent most of her life in England. She was a daughter of John De Belot. Among her novels were To a Nun Confessed, Servitude, Behind the Fan, The Garden of Spices, The House of Dolls, A Mother of Dreams, The Indelicate Duellist, An Idol's Passion, The Chant of A Lonely Heart, and other works, including many short stories.
One of her latest works before she died was the drama Une Aventure de Capitane Lebrun, produced in 1913 at the Theatre Molière, Paris.
Osgood was twice married. Her first husband was Charles Piggot Harvey. Her second husband was Robert Sherard, an English author and great-grandson of the poet Wordsworth. She divorced him in 1915, the contest being a sensation at the time. In 1911 Sherard had brought a court case against his wife, claiming that he had written a number of the books published under her name. She died at Guilsborough Hall, her Northamptonshire residence.

Sources 
 Obituary: New York Times, December 13, 1922 
 Divorce for Irene Osgood, New York Times, January 20, 1915 
 Writer sues wife for mss. and a cat, New York Times, March 23, 1911

External links 
 Play The Menace by Irene Osgood on Great War Theatre

1875 births
1922 deaths
Sherard family
20th-century American novelists
20th-century American women writers
20th-century American poets
20th-century American dramatists and playwrights
American women novelists
American women poets
American women dramatists and playwrights
19th-century American writers
19th-century American women writers
American expatriates in the United Kingdom